Oil and Water may refer to:

 A mixture of oil and water; see multiphasic liquid, oil spill, and storm oil
 "Oil and Water" (song), 2007 song by Incubus
 "Oil & Water", 2018 song by Boy George and Culture Club from the album Life
 Oil & Water EP, 2003 EP by Evermore
 Oil & Water, a 2016 album by Lee DeWyze
 Oil and Water (1913 film), American silent film
 "Oil & Water" (NCIS), 2013 TV episode